This is a discography of the singles and albums of British pop group Brotherhood of Man.

All singles and albums from 1974 are from a completely different line-up to the earlier releases. The earlier releases (on the Deram label) were credited to The Brotherhood of Man.

The group's first appearance on the chart was on 14 February 1970 in the UK with the single "United We Stand". This went on to become a hit in many other countries, including the US.

The first chart appearance of the later line-up is with the 1974 single "Lady" in Belgium and Holland. The first appearance by this line-up in the UK is with the single "Save Your Kisses For Me" on 13 March 1976. The song's entry at No.14 was the second highest Top 50 chart entry of that year (second to Queen's "Somebody to Love", which rose from 51 to 4 in a single week), due to its selection as the UK entry for the Eurovision Song Contect 

The first appearance on the UK album charts is with Love and Kisses on 24 April 1976.

Their final single chart appearance anywhere in the world was in the UK with the single "Lightning Flash" on 10 July 1982. The 3CD set Gold, released by Demon music, saw the group return to the UK album chart at No 29. Their final appearance was 30th May 2019.

Altogether they spent 98 weeks in the UK singles chart (including eight weeks at No.1) and 42 weeks in the album chart.

Albums

Studio albums

Compilation albums

Singles

Notes 

 The final three albums as listed above were not officially released, but independently produced by the group themselves, therefore ineligible for chart entry.
 A single, "Rock Me Baby" was intended for release in late 1972 by the new Brotherhood of Man line-up, but was cancelled, due to its release as a single by David Cassidy.
 In addition to the singles, track "Tell Me Tell Me Tell Me" charted at No.42 in France, and No.27 in Belgium.
 Other singles not released in the UK are: "Be My Loving Baby (Belgium, 1975), "Sweet Lady from Georgia" (US, 1976), "I Give You My Love" (Europe-various, 1976), "Singing a Song" (Spain, 1980), "Sugar Mouse" (Holland, 1980), "One Day at a Time" (South Africa, 1981), "Tus Besos Son Para Mi"/"Tu Eres Bonita" (Spain, 1991).
The first album, United We Stand was re-released on CD in 2008. The first four albums of the later line up (Good Things Happening to Images) were released on CD in May 2009.
 A DVD of the group, Greatest Hits was released by BR Music in June 2004. This featured TV appearances of the group performing many of their hit singles as well as Eurovision footage.

B-sides 
The following is a list of songs featured on B-sides, which were not included on any album

References

External links
Brotherhood of Man Official Website
Tony Hiller Official Website

Discographies of British artists
Pop music group discographies